Fort Ripley may refer to:

 Fort Ripley (South Carolina), Charleston, South Carolina, now the site of the Fort Ripley Shoal Light
 Fort Ripley (Minnesota fort), now known as Camp Ripley, Minnesota
 Fort Ripley, Minnesota, a town

See also
 Ripley (disambiguation)